Axe Giant: The Wrath of Paul Bunyan is a 2013 independent horror film produced, written and directed by Gary Jones. It follows a group of juvenile delinquents who unwittingly disturb the legendary Paul Bunyan while embarking on a rehabilitation excursion in the woods, invoking his deadly wrath.

Plot
In an unspecified snowy wilderness, a group of loggers are finishing work for the day and prepping a massive roast when a grotesque axe-wielding man emerges from the woods, massacres nearly everyone, then runs the foreman through the circular saw. Sometime later, a group of five young first-time offenders, Marty, Trish, Zack, Rosa, and CB, are taken into the woods for a week long rehabilitation excursion led by Sergeant A. Hoke and Ms. Sam Kowowzinkowski, a guidance counselor. When they arrive at the remote cabin, Hoke tells the others they will all be sleeping in tents outside while he enjoys the cabin. In the nearby woods, a grizzly bear is stalking a deer when a giant man (Bunyan) emerges from the trees, picks up the grizzly, snaps its neck, then skins and cleans the carcass.

During a night around the campfire where Ms. K talks with the youths, a local hermit, Meeks, crashes their program discussion, startling them, before Hoke runs him off and sends everyone to bed. The following morning, Hoke takes the others on a grueling hike. When they stop for lunch, Zack and Martin find the bones of a large ox jutting up from the ground. Zack takes a horn from the skull as a souvenir. Later, Bunyan visits the site, revealing it to be the grave of his ox, Babe, and finds the skull missing a horn, which enrages the giant.

The delinquents, Hoke and Ms. K stop for a break in their hike. When Martin and Zack toss the horn back and forth, a wind passes through it, alerting Bunyan to their location. The giant emerges from the trees behind an oblivious Trish—who's distracted when her phone picks up a rare signal—and brings his axe down on her, splitting her vertically in half. The others run away in a panic and Bunyan bisects Hoke, but lodges his axe in a tree, which allows the others to escape back to the cabin. Bunyan follows them and pulls their van away with him, trapping them, then returns to his cave.

Meeks runs into the campgrounds in a panic and the others let him in the cabin. Once he sees the horn, he tells the group of their misdoing and that the tall tale of Paul Bunyan is based on an actual person, the son of a 19th century lumber baron and European immigrant. He was born with a rare condition that caused extreme gigantism as well as tripling his life expectancy. In adolescence, Bunyan's blue ox, Babe, got wounded and wandered into some loggers’ area, who in turn killed Babe for the meat. Bunyan slaughtered the loggers in retaliation, which caused the nearby townspeople to seal him inside an abandoned mine. Bunyan survived and grew to his full height while living in the mountains. Meeks tells them they must return Babe's horn to Bunyan's shrine or they will all be killed.

Upon hearing this, Zack runs out of the cabin with the horn and throws it into the forest. The horn is thrown back out of the trees and impales Zack; Bunyan emerges, drags Zack's body off and returns to his cave to sharpen his axe. CB's father (who's also the local sheriff) is called to the area for a bear sighting but finds Hoke's body. Bunyan returns and smashes through the roof of the cabin. He grabs Rosa and throws her against a tree, killing her. The others rush outside and as Bunyan is about to attack them, he's shot with several tranquilizer darts by CB's father, who's just arrived on the scene. Bunyan falls backwards incapacitated, and crushes the cabin. Meeks emerges from the woods and hold them all at gunpoint while defending Bunyan. He shoots Martin and prepares to kill the others, but Bunyan regains consciousness and decapitates Meeks. Bunyan chases Sheriff, CB, and Ms. K to a footbridge over a river where they are trapped until a militia composed of local hunters arrives. They empty their weapons into Bunyan who falls seemingly mortally wounded into the river below and sinks. Sheriff, CB, and Ms. K leave with the militia.

Cast 

Amber Connor as CB Tanner
Tom Downey as Sgt. A. Hoke
Jesse Kove as Zack
Kristina Kopf as Sam Kowowzinkowski or "Ms. K"
Clifton Williams as Marty
Victoria Ramos as Rosa
Jill Evyn as Trish
Tim Lovelace as Sheriff Tanner
Chris Hahn as Gunnar Wolfgang Bunyan
Joe Estevez as Meeks
Donna Williams as Mel
Bud Moffett as Budd
Dan Haggerty as Foreman Bill
Alan Tuskes as Elmer the Cook/Militia
Daniel Alan Kiely as Greenhorn
John Schneider as Jeb/Militia
Tom Luhtala as Logger/Militia
Jeremy Price as Logger
Eric Zapata as Logger
Tony Dotson as Logger
Rachel Demski as Logging Camp Woman
Sarah Danko as Logging Camp Woman
Nicholas Arthur as Militia 
Brian Demski as Militia 
Eric Dzugan as Militia
David Greathouse as Militia
Chris Hahn as Militia 
Bryan Jones as Militia
Leo McNamee III as Militia
Leeann Pawlikowski as Militia
Sean Rodgers as Militia
Laurie Lavine as Female Guard
Mark Sikes as Burly Guard
Gary Jones as Guy Dragging Bunyan in Flashbacks
Robert Kurtzman as Guy Dragging Bunyan in Flashbacks

Soundtrack
American musical group Midnight Syndicate created the official soundtrack for the film.

Production
The film's early working title was simply Bunyan and several promotional images were released in December 2010 on Bloody Disgusting. Initial filming took place in Southern California with subsequent filming occurring in and around Mohican State Park and Crestline, Ohio.

Release and reception
Axe Giant saw a limited theatrical release, screening in two theaters for approximately two weeks and premiered May 31, 2013. The film garnered a domestic box office gross of $2,498. The film was released the following month on DVD on June 18, 2013 by Virgil Films & Entertainment and again in 2017 by Sony Pictures Home Entertainment.

There is currently one critical review on Rotten Tomatoes, originally published on Blu-ray.com that awards the film 6/10 stars. The review praises the creature design of Paul Bunyan, calling it "excellent for a B-movie production". The review argues the film's performances are forgettable, though Downey and Estevez stand out and that "the screenplay is padded with inane banter and extensive introductions, taking 40 minutes of screen time before Bunyan arrives to kill the teens".

Axe Giant was reviewed by HorrorNews.net in 2017, where it was mostly criticized. The review initially cites the characters as being one dimensional and the juvenile delinquents going camping premise as being unoriginal. Stereotypical characters aside, the review notes that “not one of the motley crew of campers is remotely likable or endearing” and that most of the performances are bland. The biggest flaw with the film according to the review, is the overuse of CGI, which weighs the film down with inconsistencies and “lessens the intended impact”. The review concludes by referencing the final showdown in the climax that it argues sends an uncomfortable “’not sure what it is so we best just kill it’ message” and ultimately does not recommend the film.

See also
 Paul Bunyan
 Axe Giant: The Wrath of Paul Bunyan (Original Motion Picture Soundtrack)

References

External links
 
 

American horror films
2013 horror films
2013 films
2010s English-language films
2010s American films